Trollaskeinuten is a mountain in the municipality of Suldal in Rogaland county, Norway.

See also
List of mountains of Norway

References

Mountains of Rogaland
Suldal